The 2006 Fresno State football team represented California State University, Fresno in the 2006 NCAA Division I FBS football season. They played their home games at Bulldog Stadium in Fresno, California and were coached by Pat Hill. The outcome of the 2006 season was a 4–8 record, the worst for Fresno State football since 1978, when the Bulldogs went 3–8. The Bulldogs lost all four non-conference games and also missed out on a bowl game for the first time in seven years. The Bulldogs also lost to rival San Jose State for the first time since 1990.

Personnel

Coaching staff

Roster

Depth chart

Schedule

Game Summaries

Nevada

No. 20 Oregon

at Washington

Colorado State

at Utah State

Hawaii

at No. 14 LSU

at No. 14 Boise State

New Mexico State

Idaho

at Louisiana Tech

at San Jose State (Rivalry)

References

Fresno State
Fresno State Bulldogs football seasons
Fresno State Bulldogs football